Workington  is a coastal town and civil parish at the mouth of the River Derwent on the west coast in the Allerdale borough of Cumbria, England. The town was historically in Cumberland. At the 2011 census it had a population of 25,207.

Location

History

The area around Workington was long a producer of coal and steel.

Between 79 and 122 CE, Roman forts, mile-forts and watchtowers were built along the Cumbrian coast, as defences against attacks by the Scoti of Ireland and the Caledonii, the most powerful tribe in what is now Scotland. The 16th-century Britannia, written by William Camden, describes ruins of these defences.

A Viking sword was discovered at Northside. This is seen to suggest there was a settlement at the river mouth.

The place-name Workington is first attested in an Anglo-Saxon charter of 946, as Wurcingtun. It appears as Wirchingetona in about 1150, meaning "the town or settlement of Weorc or Wirc's people".

Several bridges were damaged or destroyed by the River Derwent during the 2009 Workington floods.

Regeneration

In 2006, Washington Square, a £50 million shopping centre and mixed-use complex, was opened to replace the run-down St John's Arcade, built in the 1960s and 1970s. In 2007, the Royal Institution of Chartered Surveyors named Washington Square the "best commercial project" in North West England.

Works of public art installed in the town centre include:
Glass canopies designed by Alexander Beleschenko
The Coastline by Simon Hitchens
The Hub by BASE Structures and Illustrious
The Grilles architectural metalwork at Central Car Park by Tom Lomax in association with pupils from St Patrick's Primary School and Alan Dawson.
Central Way public toilets with tiles designed in collaboration by ceramic artist Paul Scott and writer Robert Drake, in addition to a fish tank containing species from the Solway provided by the Lake District Coast Aquarium in Maryport by Paul Scott and Robert Drake
Lookout Clock, an interactive town clock designed by Andy Plant and Matt Wand

While efforts have been made to find local names for the major streets of the new shopping centre, the initial planning title of Washington Square has been retained.

Workington Stadium plans
In February 2019 plans for a new stadium for Workington were announced. This would in involve the demolition of Borough Park and Derwent Park.

In June 2019, it was announced by the new leadership of Allerdale Borough Council that a new sports stadium would not be built.

Cloffocks development
A plan to build a  Tesco Extra store on the Cloffocks provoked controversy and opposition from local people; a planning application was placed in 2006 by Tesco, after it acquired the Cloffocks site for £18 million; Tesco had been competing with Asda for the site since 2003. Campaigners opposed the sale, stating that the land was common ground and belonged to the people of Workington. In 2010 the Countess of Lonsdale invoked her rights to mine the land, in an attempt to prevent the development. In 2011 a closed meeting of Allerdale councillors discussed the sale of the site, but the council rescinded on its decision to sell it to Tesco in June 2011. Tesco stated that it was still seeking a site for a store of around  Workington to replace the established one.

Closure of MEP's European Parliament office
In 2014, North West MEP Julie Ward closed her Workington office and relocated it to Manchester.

Workington Man
During the 2019 General Election, the concept of "Workington Man" was devised by a think tank as a key election target.

In November 2019, Nigel Farage visited Workington to campaign on behalf of the Brexit Party.

Governance
The town is part of the parliamentary constituency of Workington. Historically it has been a Labour-supporting area, but in the 2019 general election, the Conservative Party candidate for Workington, Mark Jenkinson, was elected as the Member of Parliament (MP), overturning a 9.4 per cent Labour majority from the 2017 election to eject Shadow Environment Secretary Sue Hayman by a margin of 4,136 votes. Until the December 2019 general election, the Labour Party had won the seat in every general election since 1979. Workington had elected a Conservative MP only once since World War II, at the 1976 by-election.

Before Brexit, Workington was in the North West England European Parliamentary Constituency.

For local government purposes, Workington is covered by the Seaton + Northside, St Michaels, Moorclose + Moss Bay, Harrington + Salterbeck, and St Johns wards on Allerdale Borough Council. The divisions for Cumbria County Council are Seaton, St Michaels, St Johns + Great Clifton,
Moorclose + Moss Bay, and Harrington.

Workington has a parish council: Workington Town Council. The current mayor (2022–2023) is Denise Rollo.

Geography
Workington lies astride the River Derwent, on the West Cumbrian coastal plain. It is bounded to the west by the Solway Firth, part of the Irish Sea, and to the east by the Lake District.

The town has various districts, many of them established as housing estates. North of the river these include Seaton, Barepot, Northside, Port and Oldside. On the south side are the districts of Stainburn, Derwent Howe, Ashfield, Banklands, Frostoms (Annie Pit), Mossbay, Moorclose, Salterbeck, Bridgefoot, Lillyhall, Harrington, High Harrington, Clay Flatts, Kerry Park, Westfield and Great Clifton. The Marsh and Quay, a large working-class area of the town around the docks and a major part of the town's history, was demolished in the early 1980s. Much of its former area is now covered by Clay Flatts Industrial Estate.

Economy

Iron and steel

The Cumbria iron-ore field lies to the south of Workington, and produced extremely high grade phosphorus-free haematite. The area had a long tradition of iron smelting, but this became particularly important with the invention by Sir Henry Bessemer of the Bessemer process, the first process for mass production of mild steel, which previously had been an expensive specialist product. For the first 25 years of the process, until Gilchrist and Thomas improved upon it, phosphorus-free haematite was required. With Cumbria as the world's premier source, and the local coalfield providing energy for steel production, the world's first large-scale steelworks was opened in the Moss Bay area of the town. The Bessemer converter continued to work until July 1974. The Moss Bay Steelworks closed in 1982, despite receiving notable infrastructural investment and improvement almost immediately before the closure.

During the Second World War, a strategically important electric steel furnace which produced steel for aircraft engine ball bearings was moved to Workington from Norway to prevent it falling into Axis hands.

Workington was the home of Distington Engineering Company (DEC), the engineering arm of British Steel Corporation (BSC), which specialised in the design of continuous casting equipment. DEC, known to the local people as "Chapel Bank", had an engineering design office, engineering workshops and a foundry that at one time contained six of the seven electric arc furnaces built in Workington. The seventh was situated at the Moss Bay plant of BSC. In the 1970s, as BSC adapted to a more streamlined approach to the metals industry, the engineering design company was separated from the workshops and foundry and re-designated as Distington Engineering Contracting. Employing some 200 people, its primary purpose was the design, manufacture, installation and commissioning of continuous casting machines. This business is now owned by the TATA Group and employs 400 staff.

One offshoot of the steel industry was the production of railway rails. Workington rails were widely exported and a common local phrase was that Workington rails "held the world together." Originally made from Bessemer steel, but after the closure of the Moss Bay Steelworks, steel for the plant was brought by rail from Teesside. The plant was closed in August 2006, but welding work on rails produced at Corus Groups' French plant in Hayange continued at Workington for another two years, as the Scunthorpe site initially proved incapable of producing rails adequately.

After coal and steel
After the loss of the two industries on which Workington was built, coal and steel, Workington and the whole of West Cumbria became an unemployment blackspot. Industries in the town today include chemicals, cardboard, the docks (originally built by the United Steel Co.), waste management and recycling old computers for export, mainly to poorer countries. The town also houses the British Cattle Movement Service, a government agency set up to oversee the British beef and dairy industry after the BSE crisis in Britain. It is based in the former steelworks offices. Many Workington residents are employed outside the town in the nuclear industry located in and around Sellafield, West Cumbria's dominant employment sector.

Vehicle Manufacture

British Leyland opened a factory in Lillyhall, just outside Workington, initially to build the Leyland National bus in the 1970s and 1980s. Produced primarily for the state-owned National Bus Company, the Leyland National was styled by Italian designer Giovanni Michelotti, and included a roof-mounted heating unit in a pod at the rear of the bus. The Lillyhall factory later built the Leyland Titan, Leyland Olympian and Leyland Lynx buses.

In the 1980s, Leyland manufactured Pacer railbus and Sprinter-type commuter trains at Workington. The bodyshells of the Pacer trains were based on the Leyland National bus design, designed as a cheap stop-gap by British Rail.

Volvo Buses acquired Leyland Buses in 1988. By 1993, the factory had closed with the loss of 200 jobs. The former bus plant is now a warehouse for the logistics company Eddie Stobart, which bought the property in 1995.

Transport
Workington is linked by the A596 road to Maryport, to Whitehaven via A595 road, by the A66 road to Penrith and continues to Scotch Corner in County Durham. The town has its own bus station and bus services to other towns and villages in Cumbria, such as Cockermouth, Keswick, Penrith, Carlisle, Wigton, Maryport, Whitehaven, Frizington, Egremont and Thornhill.

Workington North railway station opened on 30 November 2009 as a temporary means of crossing the river after road bridges had been closed by flooding. A free train service between Workington (Main) and Maryport was funded by the government.

The Workington Transport Heritage Trust, preserves the transport heritage of Workington and the surrounding area and is run by volunteers.

Workington was the headquarters of the haulage company J. Roper (Workington) Ltd, which was based in Moss Bay.

Arts and entertainment

Workington is home to three theatres: the Carnegie Theatre, Theatre Royal and Workington Opera House. In the past Workington was a big town for variety acts and theatre and hosted many top acts including Tommy Cooper and Shirley Bassey. Workington Opera House also hosted many circus shows that included elephants and other circus animals performing on stage.

The Carnegie Theatre and Theatre Royal are still open and put on performances all year round. The Workington Opera House is currently closed after its last use as a bingo hall. The "Opera Action" group plans to restore it as a working theatre.

The town once had four cinemas (the Carnegie, the Hippodrome, the Oxford and the Ritz), all now closed. There remains only the Plaza Cinema at Dunmail Park. During the 1950s, films were also shown at the Opera House.

Cultural festivals
On 19 September 2009, Valentine Rock took place; a 19-band charity music festival. It was staged at the Ernest Valentine Ground home of Workington Cricket Club. Artists included The , Novellos, With Lights Out, Volcanoes, Breed, Colt 45, Relics, Telf, Thir13een, Slagbank, Hangin' Threads and Hand of Fate. Profits went to the RNLI and West Cumberland Lions.

In 2008, the Paint Your Town Red Festival invited Liverpool comic and actor Ricky Tomlinson. Described as 'The biggest free festival in Workington's history', the 2008 festival included a free children's fun fair in Vulcan Park and stage and street entertainment. Attractions included "Jimmy James and his Soul Explosion", "Dearham Band" and the all-female band "Irresistible". Keswick's "Cars of the Stars" museum provided a stunt driving display.

Sport

Uppies and Downies

Workington is home to the ball game known as Uppies and Downies, a traditional version of football with medieval origins in mob football or an even earlier form. Since 2001, matches have raised over £75,000 for local charities. An Uppies and Downies ball is made from four pieces of cow leather. Only three hand-made balls are produced every year and each is dated.

Football

The town has a football team, Workington A.F.C., with its stadium at Borough Park. Formerly a professional football team it now competes as a non-League club. "Dronnies", a group of steel workers that had migrated to the town from Dronfield, Derbyshire, formed the nucleus of the original Workington F.C. in 1888.  It was one of the first teams managed by Bill Shankly.

Workington A.F.C. was replaced in the Football League by Wimbledon F.C. in 1977.

Rugby League

The town has a semi-professional rugby league team, Workington Town, based at Derwent Park stadium.

Rugby Union

Workington is the home to the rugby union team Workington Zebras, which plays its matches on the Ellis Sports Ground.

Bowling
There are two bowling greens, one in Vulcan Park and another on High Cloffocks, south of the River Derwent. Teams and individuals from both greens compete in local, regional and national competitions.

Golf
Workington's first golf club appeared in 1893 and played north of the River Derwent near Siddick. Known as West Cumberland Golf Club, it used a nine-hole course until the First World War, when it closed. After the war the club formed again as Workington Golf Club and moved to the present Hunday Wood location. Five-times Open Champion and renowned course architect James Braid was consulted on the layout. Considered "one of the premier courses in Cumbria", it was influenced in the 1950s by F. G. Hawtree and by Howard Swan today.

Speedway

Workington Comets are the town's professional speedway team, which competes in the British Speedway Premier League.

Before World War II racing was staged at Lonsdale Park, next to Borough Park, on the banks of the River Derwent. The sport did not return to the town until 1970, when it was introduced to Derwent Park by local entrepreneur Paul Sharp and Ian Thomas, who is the present team manager (2009). In 1987, Derwent Park was a temporary home to the Glasgow Tigers, which briefly became the Workington Tigers before withdrawing from the league. Speedway returned to Workington, and the team has operated with varying degrees of success, but in 2008 it won the Young Shield and the Premier League Four-Team and Pairs Championships. An academy team under the banner of Northside Stars, develops young riders who show potential at the Northside training track and may make future first teams.

Cricket

Workington Cricket Club plays at the Ernest Valentine Ground, on the High Cloffock near the River Derwent and the town centre. It is a thriving club with three senior teams and a growing junior section putting out six teams. It is affiliated to Cumbria Cricket League, Cumbria Cricket Board, Cumbria Junior Cricket League and the West Allerdale & Copeland Cricket Association.

Cumbria Cricket Board Open Courses are led by coaches at the town's Stainburn School. These are open to Years 4–10 pupils.

Angling
Workington and District Sea Angling Club takes part in regular monthly matches. It meets every month in the Union Jack Club, Senhouse Street, Workington. It also arranges tuition for its anglers.

Freshwater anglers are active on local rivers, especially the River Derwent.

Athletics
Workington has opportunities for track and field, triathlon, road running, cross-country, fell running and orienteering. All of its schools and clubs are affiliated to the Cumbria Athletics Association, except orienteering which is organised through its own national federation. Athletes tend to join clubs which concentrate on their particular discipline. Cumberland Fell Runners; Cumberland Athletics Club; Derwent and West Cumberland AC; Seaton Athletics Club; Workington Zebras AC and West Cumberland Orienteering Club are the most popular at present.

Primary schools have a well organised inter-school programme. Secondary schools focus especially on the Allerdale District School's Championships, which lead on to the Cumbria Schools Championships. The results of Cumbria's championships guide selection of the county teams to compete in the English Schools Athletic Association Championships. Over the years, Workington athletes have earned English Schools Championship honours.

Motorbike road riding
There is a Cumbria Coalition of Motorcycle Clubs. The West Cumbrian motorcycle club, the Roadburners, was established in 1989 and regularly features at local and national motorbike rallies and charity road runs. It welcomes new members interested in multi-cylinder machines. The National Chopper Club also has some local members.

Notable people

Twin towns
 Selm, Germany
 Val-de-Reuil, France

See also

Listed buildings in Workington
The Stars Look Down, film partly filmed at St Helens Siddick Colliery at Workington.
Workington Academy
Derwent Park
Borough Park (Workington)

References

External links

 Cumbria County History Trust: Workington (nb: provisional research only – see Talk page)
Allerdale Borough Council
Workington Tourism Guide

Workington
Towns in Cumbria
Ports and harbours of Cumbria
Populated coastal places in Cumbria
Civil parishes in Cumbria
Allerdale